Isaac Yaw Opoku is a Ghanaian politician and member of parliament for the Offinso South constituency in the Ashanti region of Ghana.

Early life and education 
He was born on 27 August 1957 and hails from Offinso in the Ashanti region of Ghana. He holds a PhD in Mycology in 1993.

Career 
He was the executive director of Cocoa Research Institute of Ghana under Cocobod.

Political career 
He is a member of NPP and currently the MP for Offinso South Constituency. In the 2020 General Elections, he won the parliamentary seat with 39,971 votes whilst Yussif Haruna had 19,952 votes.

Committees 
He is a member of the Members Holding Offices of Profit Committee and also a member of the Trade, Industry and Tourism Committee.

Personal life 
Opoku is a Christian.

References 

Ghanaian MPs 2021–2025
New Patriotic Party politicians
1957 births
Living people